Cesar Antonio Perry Soto (born February 25, 1986) is a Mexican-American musician, best known as the lead guitarist of the rock band Pierce the Veil.

Early life
Perry was born Cesar Antonio Perry Soto in Tijuana, Mexico on February 25, 1986.

Career 
Perry joined Pierce the Veil in 2007 for the release of the band's first full-length album A Flair for the Dramatic. In the following years, he released four albums with the band, Selfish Machines, Collide with the Sky, Misadventures, and The Jaws of Life.

He has toured in North America, South America, Australia, Asia and Europe several times. Perry has performed at many big music festivals such as Rock am Ring and Rock im Park, Reading and Leeds, Warped Tour, Soundwave Festival and Slam Dunk Festival. Pierce the Veil has shared the stage with acts such as Bring Me the Horizon, Black Veil Brides,  All Time Low, Sleeping with Sirens, Tonight Alive and A Day to Remember.

Awards 
 AP Music Awards, Best Guitarist 2016 (won)

References

External links

Living people
American rock guitarists
American male guitarists
Lead guitarists
Pierce the Veil members
1986 births
People from Tijuana
American musicians of Mexican descent